Krakowiany may refer to the following places in Poland:
Krakowiany, Lower Silesian Voivodeship (south-west Poland)
Krakowiany, Masovian Voivodeship (east-central Poland)
Krakowiany, West Pomeranian Voivodeship (north-west Poland)